George Young Blair (10 March 1824 Drumrauch near Dundee – Drumrauch Hall 22 September 1894) was a Scottish marine engineer, who specialised in the building of triple expansion engines at his factory Blair & Co., Ltd. in Stockton-on-Tees.

Business life
In 1855 George Blair was appointed manager of Fossick & Hackworth, becoming a partner in 1865. The firm was renamed Fossick, Blair & Co. on Hackworth's retirement, and when Fossick died in 1866 it became Blair & Co.

Blair's management led to the firm's specialising in marine engines. The 700 employees grew to 2 000, and the works covered seven and a half acres. Blair produced the first compound steam engine built on the Tees in January 1869 and fitted it to the Glenmore  built by Backhouse & Dixon. This was followed in 1884 by its first triple-expansion engine, fitted to the Burgos which had been built by Richardson, Duck and Company.

In 1887 Blair constructed massive sheerlegs next to the Tees. These were capable of lifting 100 tons of marine engine into new ships. By 1914 the yard had turned out some 1 400 marine engines, followed by 75 during World War I. After the War the firm was taken over by Gould Steamships and Industrials in 1919.

Personal life
George Young Blair was born at Drumrauch Farm, Pittenweem, Fife, Scotland, and married Margaret Borrie (1836–1888), daughter of Peter Borrie and Jean Simson, on 4 September 1862 at St. Hilda's Church, Middlesbrough, Yorkshire, North Riding, England.

He constructed the family home, Drumrauch Hall, and bought Linden Grove, also at Hutton Rudby in Yorkshire. In 1862 his residence was at 149 High Street, Stockton-on-Tees. He acted as Justice of the Peace for County Durham. 
The children of George Young Blair and Margaret Borrie were:

 Peter Borrie Blair 1866-1891 Stockton (typhoid)
 Mary Young Blair 1867-1935 x Percy Sadler, eldest son of industrialist Sir Samuel Sadler
 Florence Jean Blair c 1869-1917 (never married)
 Margaret Amy Blair 1870-1907 x 1899 Smollett Clerk Thomson, a Scottish bank agent

External links
A reference archive of ships built on the River Tees 1850 - 1990

References

1824 births
1894 deaths
People from Pittenweem
British steam engine engineers
British marine engineers
Scottish engineers